was a feudal domain under the Tokugawa shogunate of Edo period Japan, located in Shimotsuke Province (modern-day Tochigi Prefecture), Japan. It was centered on Ashikaga jin'ya in what is now part of the city of Ashikaga. Ashikaga was ruled through most of its history by a junior branch of the Toda clan.

History
The Ashikaga clan which ruled Japan during the Muromachi period established a branch government at their ancestral homeland of Ashikaga shōen in Shimotsuke to govern the Kantō region. However, by the late Sengoku period, this branch of the Ashikaga were very much weakened by the constant battles against the Uesugi clan, Takeda clan and Odawara Hojo clan, and were eventually dispossessed after the 1590 Battle of Odawara.

In 1688, Shōgun Tokugawa Tsunayoshi elevated his mother’s half-brother, Honjō Munesuke, to the rank of daimyō and assigned him a 10,000 koku territory on the former Ashikaga lands. He was later awarded an increase to 20,000 koku before being transferred to Kasama Domain in Hitachi Province in 1692.

In 1705, despite his somewhat advanced age, the hatamoto Toda Tadatoki received an additional 3000 koku in addition to his existing 8000 koku by Shōgun Tokugawa Ienobu as a reward for his long service, and Ashikaga domain was revived. The Toda continued to rule Ashikaga until the end of the Edo period. The final daimyō, Toda Tadayuki served the Tokugawa shogunate as Rikugun bugyō, but later switched allegiance to the pro-imperial cause in the Boshin war of the Meiji restoration.

After the abolition of the han system in July 1871, Ashikaga Domain became part of Tochigi Prefecture.

The domain had a population of 6,826 people in 1473 households, of which 383 were samurai in 106 households per a census in 1870.

Holdings at the end of the Edo period
As with most domains in the han system, Ashikaga Domain consisted of several discontinuous territories calculated to provide the assigned kokudaka, based on periodic cadastral surveys and projected agricultural yields.

Shimotsuke Province
7 villages in Tsuga District
3 villages in Yanada District
9villages in Ashikaga District
Musashi Province
5 villages in Saitama District

List of daimyō

References

External links
  Ashikaga on "Edo 300 HTML"

Notes

Domains of Japan
1705 establishments in Japan
States and territories established in 1705
1871 disestablishments in Japan
States and territories disestablished in 1871
Shimotsuke Province
History of Tochigi Prefecture